Bromoform (CHBr3) is a brominated organic solvent, colorless liquid at room temperature, with a high refractive index, very high density, and sweet odor is similar to that of chloroform. It is one of the four haloforms, the others being fluoroform, chloroform, and iodoform.  Currently its main use is as a laboratory reagent. It is soluble in about 800 parts water and is miscible with alcohol, benzene, chloroform, ether, petroleum ether, acetone and oils.

Structure
The molecule adopts tetrahedral molecular geometry with C3v symmetry.

Synthesis
Bromoform can be prepared by the haloform reaction using acetone and sodium hypobromite, by the electrolysis of potassium bromide in ethanol, or by treating chloroform with aluminium bromide.

Uses
Only small quantities of bromoform are currently produced industrially in the United States. In the past, it was used as a solvent, sedative and flame retardant, but now it is mainly used as a laboratory reagent, for example as an extraction solvent.

Bromoform also has medical uses; injections of bromoform are sometimes used instead of epinephrine to treat severe asthma cases. 

Bromoform's high density makes it useful for separation of minerals by density. When two samples are mixed with bromoform and then allowed to settle, the top layer will contain minerals less dense than bromoform, and the bottom layer will contain denser minerals. Slightly less dense minerals can be separated in the same way by mixing the bromoform with a small amount of a less dense and miscible solvent.

Bromoform is known as an inhibitor of methanogenesis and is a common component of seaweed. Following research by CSIRO and its spin-off FutureFeed, several companies are now growing seaweed, in particular from the genus Asparagopsis, to use as a feed additive for livestock to reduce methane emissions from ruminants.

Environment and Toxicology
Natural production of bromoform by phytoplankton and seaweeds in the ocean is thought to be its predominant source in the environment. However, locally significant amounts of bromoform enter the environment formed as disinfection byproducts known as trihalomethanes when chlorine is added to drinking water to kill bacteria. It is somewhat soluble in water and readily evaporates into the air.  Bromoform is the main trihalomethane produced in beachfront salt water swimming pools with concentrations as high as 1.2 ppm (parts per million). Concentrations in freshwater pools are 1000 times lower.  Occupational skin exposure limits are set at 0.5 ppm.

The substance may be hazardous to the environment, and special attention should be given to aquatic organisms.  Its volatility and environmental persistence makes bromoform's release, either as liquid or vapor, strongly inadvisable.

Bromoform can be absorbed into the body by inhalation and through the skin.  The substance is irritating to the respiratory tract, the eyes, and the skin, and may cause effects on the central nervous system and liver, resulting in impaired functions. Its LD50 is 7.2 mmol/kg in mice, or 1.8g/kg. The International Agency for Research on Cancer (IARC) concluded that bromoform is not classifiable as to human carcinogenicity. The EPA classified bromoform as a probable human carcinogen.

References
 PDF
U.S. Department of Health and Human Services. Toxicological Profile for Bromoform and Dibromochloromethane . August 2005.

External links

Entry at chemicalland21.com
Toxicological profile for bromoform and dibromochlormethane
Toxicity summary
IARC Summaries & Evaluations: Vol. 62 (1991), Vol. 71 (1999)
ChemSub Online: Bromoform

Bromoalkanes
Halomethanes
Halogenated solvents
Flame retardants
IARC Group 3 carcinogens
Halogen-containing natural products
Bromine-containing natural products
Sweet-smelling chemicals
Tribromomethyl compounds